Gary Anthony James Webb (born 8 March 1958), known professionally as Gary Numan, is an English musician. He entered the music industry as frontman of the new wave band Tubeway Army. After releasing two albums with the band, he released his debut solo album The Pleasure Principle in 1979, topping the UK Albums Chart. While his commercial popularity peaked in the late 1970s and early 1980s with hits including "Are 'Friends' Electric?" and "Cars" (both of which reached number one on the UK Singles Chart), Numan maintains a cult following. He has sold over 10 million records.

Numan faced intense hostility from critics and fellow musicians in his early career, but has since come to be regarded as a pioneer of electronic music. He developed a signature sound consisting of heavy synthesiser hooks fed through guitar effects pedals, and is also known for his distinctive voice and androgynous "android" persona. In 2017, he received an Ivor Novello Award, the Inspiration Award, from the British Academy of Songwriters, Composers, and Authors.

Early life
Gary Anthony James Webb was born on 8 March 1958 in Hammersmith, London. His father was a British Airways bus driver based at Heathrow Airport. He was the only child until he was seven when his family adopted his cousin (father's nephew) John, who would also become a musician and play in Numan's backing band. He was educated at Town Farm Junior School in Stanwell; Ashford County Grammar School; and Slough Grammar School, followed by Brooklands Technical College in Weybridge, Surrey. He joined the Air Training Corps as a teenager and then briefly held various jobs including forklift truck driver, air conditioning ventilator fitter, and accounts clerk.

When Numan was 15, his father bought him a Gibson Les Paul, which became his most treasured possession. He briefly played in various bands  and looked through ads in Melody Maker for bands to join. He claims to have unsuccessfully auditioned as guitarist for the then-unknown band the Jam before joining Mean Street and the Lasers, where he met Paul Gardiner. The latter band would soon become Tubeway Army, with his uncle Jess Lidyard on drums and Gardiner on bass.  The band were quickly signed to Beggars Banquet Records. His initial pseudonym was Valerian, probably in reference to the hero in French science fiction comic series Valérian and Laureline. He later picked the surname Numan from an advertisement in the Yellow Pages for a plumber whose surname was Neumann.

Music career

1977–1979: Tubeway Army and The Pleasure Principle
Numan came to prominence in the 1970s as lead singer, songwriter, and record producer for Tubeway Army. After recording an album's worth of punk-influenced demo tapes (released in 1984 as The Plan), they were signed by Beggars Banquet Records in 1978 and quickly released two singles, "That's Too Bad", which reached #97 on the UK Top 100 Charts and "Bombers", which did not chart.

A self-titled, new wave-oriented debut album later that same year sold out its limited run and introduced Numan's fascination with dystopian science fiction and synthesisers. Though Tubeway Army's third single, the dark-themed and slow-paced "Down in the Park" (1979), never appeared on the charts, it became one of Numan's most enduring and oft-covered songs. It was featured with other contemporary hits on the soundtrack for the 1980 film Times Square, and a live version of the song can be seen in the 1982 film Urgh! A Music War. Following exposure in a television advertisement for Lee Cooper jeans with the jingle "Don't Be a Dummy", Tubeway Army released the single "Are 'Friends' Electric?" in May 1979. After a modest start at the lower reaches of the UK Singles Chart at No. 71, it steadily climbed to No. 1 at the end of June and remained on that position for four consecutive weeks. In July its parent album Replicas also reached No. 1 on the albums chart.

At this point Numan was already busy recording his next album with a new backing band. At the peak of success, Numan opted to premiere four new songs in a John Peel session in June 1979 rather than promoting the current album and the Tubeway Army group name was dropped.

In September "Cars" also reached No. 1 in the UK. The single also found success in North American charts where "Cars" spent 2 weeks at No. 1 on the Canadian RPM charts, and reached No. 9 in the U.S. in 1980. "Cars" and the 1979 album The Pleasure Principle were both released under Numan's own stage name. The album reached number-one in the UK, and a sell-out tour (The Touring Principle) followed; the concert video it spawned is often cited as the first full-length commercial music video release. The Pleasure Principle was a rock album with no guitars; instead, Numan used synthesisers connected to effects units to achieve a distorted, phased, metallic tone. A second single from the album, "Complex", made it to No. 6 on the UK Singles Chart.

1980–1983: Solo success and new musical directions

In 1980, Numan topped the UK album charts for a third time with Telekon, and the singles "We Are Glass" and "I Die: You Die", released prior to the album, reaching No. 5 and No. 6 on the UK charts. "This Wreckage", the final single taken from the album, entered the UK top 20 in December that year. Telekon, the final studio album that Numan retrospectively termed the "Machine" section of his career, reintroduced guitars to Numan's music and featured a wider range of synthesisers. The same year he embarked on his second major tour ("The Teletour") with an even more elaborate stage show than the Touring Principle the previous year. In April 1981, Numan decided to retire from touring following his upcoming series of concerts at Wembley Arena, where he was supported by experimental musician Nash the Slash and Shock, a rock/mime/burlesque troupe whose members included Barbie Wilde, Tik and Tok, and Carole Caplin. A live two album set from the 1979 and 1980 tours released at this time reached No. 2 in the UK charts. Both albums, also individually released as Living Ornaments '79 and Living Ornaments '80 also charted. The decision to retire would be short-lived.

Departing from the pure electropop that he had been associated with, Numan began experimenting with jazz, funk, and ethereal, rhythmic pop. His first album after his 1981 farewell concerts was Dance (1981). The album charted at No. 3 on the UK charts, with an eight-week chart run and produced one hit single ("She's Got Claws"), which reached No. 6. The album featured several distinguished guest players; Mick Karn (bass guitar; saxophone) and Rob Dean (guitar) of Japan, Roger Mason (keyboards) of Models, and Roger Taylor (drums) of Queen.

With his former backing band, Chris Payne (keyboards; viola), Russell Bell (guitar), and Ced Sharpley (drums) now reformed as Dramatis, Numan contributed vocals to the minor hit "Love Needs No Disguise" from the album For Future Reference and lent vocals to the first single released by his long-term bassist Paul Gardiner, "Stormtrooper in Drag", which also made the charts. However, Numan's success began to wane as he was outsold by the Human League, Duran Duran, Depeche Mode, and even his prior support act, Orchestral Manoeuvres in the Dark. With each new album, Numan would take on a particular persona, but none seemed to catch audiences' attention like he had been able to in 1979.

The album I, Assassin (1982) fared less well than Dance. Despite producing the top 10 hit "We Take Mystery (To Bed)" and two top 20 singles, the album peaked at No. 8 with a six-week chart run. The heavily percussive funk style however made several tracks from the album such as the 12" version of "Music for Chameleons" and a special remix of "White Boys and Heroes" unexpected successes in the American club scene and 18 months after Numan's "farewell concerts" in April 1981 he embarked on a US tour.

Warriors (1983) further developed Numan's jazz-influenced style and featured contributions from avant-garde musician Bill Nelson (who fell out with Numan during recording and chose to be uncredited as the album's co-producer), and saxophonist Dick Morrissey (who also performed on Strange Charm and Outland). The album peaked at No. 12, produced two hit singles including the top 20 title-track and, like I, Assassin, spent six weeks in the charts. Warriors was the last album Numan recorded for Beggars Banquet Records, and was supported by a 40-date UK tour (again with support from robotic mime and music duo Tik and Tok).

1984–1990: Record label foundation and collaborations
Numan subsequently issued a series of albums and singles on his own record label, Numa. The first album released on Numa, 1984's Berserker was also notable for being Numan's first foray into music computers/samplers, in this case, the PPG Wave. The album was accompanied by a new blue-and-white visual image (including Numan himself with blue hair), a tour, a live album/video/EP, and the title track reached the UK top 40 when released as a single. Despite this, the album divided critics and fans and performed poorly. Numan cites many reasons for this, including distribution issues.

A collaboration with Bill Sharpe of Shakatak as Sharpe & Numan in 1985 was more successful. In March the single "Change Your Mind" reached No. 17 on the UK Singles Chart. A few months later the live album White Noise recorded during the Berserker Tour and a live EP with tracks taken from it (titled The Live EP) reached No. 29 and 27 respectively on the charts.

Numan's next album, The Fury (1985), charted slightly higher than Berserker, breaking the top 30. Again, the album heralded a change of image, this time featuring Numan in a white suit and red bow tie. The three singles released from the album ("Your Fascination", "Call Out the Dogs" and "Miracles") all charted in the top 50 on the UK charts.

In 1986 Numan scored two top 30-hits on the UK Singles Chart with "This Is Love" in April and "I Can't Stop" in June, but the album Strange Charm released later that year only spent two weeks on the album chart, peaking at No. 59. In November a version of the song "I Still Remember" from the previous album was released as a charity single and stalled at No. 74 on the singles chart.

Further collaborations with Bill Sharpe spawned two more Sharpe & Numan chart hits with "New Thing from London Town" at No. 52 in 1986 and "No More Lies" at No. 35 in 1988. In 1987, Numan performed vocals for three singles by Radio Heart, a project of brothers Hugh and David Nicholson, formerly of Marmalade and Blue, which charted with varying success ("Radio Heart" No. 35 UK, "London Times" No. 48, "All Across the Nation" No. 81). An album was also released, credited to "Radio Heart featuring Gary Numan" although Numan only appeared on three tracks, but failed to chart. Also in 1987, Numan's old label Beggars Banquet released the best-of compilation Exhibition, which reached No. 43 on the UK Albums Chart, and a remix of "Cars". The remix, titled "Cars (E Reg Model)" charted at No. 16, Numan's final top 20 hit until the 1996 rerelease of the same song.

Numa Records, which had been launched in a flurry of idealistic excitement, folded after the release of Numan's 1986 album Strange Charm. Numan would reopen the record label in 1992, but it was again shuttered in 1996. In addition to Numa Records' commercial failure, Numan's own fortune amassed since the late 1970s, which he estimated at £4.5 million, was drained. Numan then signed to I.R.S. Records through his final studio album of the 1980s, Metal Rhythm (1988), which also sold relatively poorly. For its American release, the record label changed the album's title to New Anger after the album's lead single, changed the album colour from black to blue, and remixed several of its tracks against Numan's wishes. In 1989, the Sharpe & Numan album Automatic was released through Polydor Records, though this too failed to garner much commercial success, briefly entering the charts and peaking at No. 59.

1991–2008: Worldwide acknowledgement 

In 1991, Numan ventured into film-scoring by co-composing the music for The Unborn with Michael R. Smith (the score was later released as the 1995 album Human). After Outland (1991), another critical and commercial disappointment and his second and last studio album with I.R.S., Numan reactivated Numa Records, under which he would release his next two albums. He supported Orchestral Manoeuvres in the Dark (who had opened for him in 1979) on a 1993 arena tour. By 1994, Numan decided to stop attempting to crack the pop market and concentrate instead on exploring more personal themes, including his vocal atheism. His future wife Gemma encouraged him to strip away the influences of the more recent years. Numan thus sought a grittier, more industrial tone for his songwriting on the album Sacrifice, on which, for the first time, he played almost all the instruments himself. Luckily, Nine Inch Nails, who were influenced by Numan's music, and other bands with industrial tendencies were contemporaneously becoming famous, and Sacrifice received critical acclaim. According to Numan, the influence was mutual. He cites "Closer" as his favorite Nine Inch Nails song, and has said "Head Like a Hole" has "the best chorus ever".

Sacrifice was the last album Numan made before shutting down Numa Records permanently. His next two studio albums, Exile (1997) and Pure (2000), were well received and significantly helped to restore his critical reputation, as did a tribute album, Random. Random was released shortly before Exile and featured artists, such as Damon Albarn and Jesus Jones, who had been influenced by Numan. Numan toured the U.S. in support of Exile, his first stateside concerts since the early 1980s.

In 2002, Numan enjoyed chart success once again with the single "Rip", reaching No. 29 on the UK Singles Chart, and again in 2003 with the Gary Numan vs Rico single "Crazier", which reached No. 13 in the UK charts. Rico also worked on the 2003 remix album Hybrid which featured reworkings of older songs in a more contemporary industrial style as well as new material. Other artists and producers who contributed on these remixes included Curve, Flood, Andy Gray, Alan Moulder, New Disease, and Sulpher. 2003 also saw Numan performing the vocals on "Pray for You", the single from the Plump DJs album Eargasm, which reached #89 on the UK Top 100 Chart. In 2005, Numan took control of his own business affairs again with the launch of his recording label, Mortal Records. On 13 March 2006, Numan's album, Jagged, was released. An album launch gig took place at The Forum, London on 18 March followed by UK, European and U.S. tours in support of the release. Numan also launched a Jagged website to showcase the new album, and made plans to have his 1981 farewell concert (previously released as Micromusic on VHS) issued on DVD by November 2006 as well as releasing the DVD version of the Jagged album launch gig. Numan undertook a brief Telekon 'Classic Album' tour in the UK in December 2006, performing at Rock City, the Kentishtown Forum and Club Academy.

Numan contributed vocals to four tracks on the April 2007 release of the debut solo album by Ade Fenton, Artificial Perfect, on his new industrial/electronic label, Submission, including "The Leather Sea", "Slide Away", "Recall", and the first single to be taken from the album, "Healing". The second single to be released in the UK was "The Leather Sea" on 30 July 2007, which charted.

He sold out a 15-date UK and Ireland tour in spring 2008, during which he performed his 1979 number-one album Replicas in its entirety, and all the Replicas-era music including B-sides. The successful tour reflected the resurging popularity of Electropop in the UK and coincided with his 50th birthday and 30th anniversary of the original release of Replicas.

In November 2007, Numan confirmed via his website that work on a new album, with the working title of Splinter, would be under way throughout 2008, after finishing an alternate version of Jagged (called Jagged Edge) and the CD of unreleased songs from his previous three albums (released in 2011 as Dead Son Rising). Numan released his subsequent album, Splinter (Songs From a Broken Mind), in 2013.

2009–present

Numan was set to perform a small number of American live dates in April 2010, including a Coachella Festival appearance in California, but had to cancel because air travel in Europe was halted by the Icelandic volcanic ash cloud. As a result, the tour was not only postponed but expanded, and his Pleasure Principle 30th Anniversary Tour's American and Mexican dates began on 17 October 2010, at Firestone Live in Orlando, Florida.

Numan toured Australia in May 2011 performing his seminal album The Pleasure Principle in its entirety to celebrate its thirtieth anniversary. Joining him on tour was Australian electronic band Severed Heads, coming out of retirement especially for the shows.

Numan lent his vocals to the track "My Machines" on Battles's 2011 album Gloss Drop. He was chosen by Battles to perform at the ATP Nightmare Before Christmas festival that they co-curated in December 2011 in Minehead, England. Numan's album Dead Son Rising was released on 16 September 2011 which had a full UK tour split in two-halves, 15–21 September and 7–11 December, Both parts were supported by Welsh soloist Jayce Lewis in an interview during the tour; Numan praised Lewis for being the best supporting act ever in his 30 years of touring, later documenting the tour in a tour diary and publicly inviting Lewis to join him for an American tour in 2012.

Numan also provided narration for Aurelio Voltaire's 5th short film in his ChimeraScope series, Odokuro in 2011, which won 12 awards and was shown as a selection at numerous film festivals between 2011 and 2013.

The album Splinter (Songs from a Broken Mind), was released on 14 October 2013. It reached the UK Top 20, his first album to do so for 30 years. It was promoted by an extensive US, Canada, UK and Ireland tour which continued in 2014 to include Israel, New Zealand, Australia and Europe. A further US leg took place in late 2014.

In June 2014, Numan collaborated with Jayce Lewis and his Protafield project on the track "Redesign" featured on Protafield's Nemesis Album. 
Numan also provided vocals for the song "Long Way Down", composed by Masafumi Takada with lyrics written by Rich Dickerson, for the video game The Evil Within, which was released on 14 October 2014. Numan performed a sold-out, one-off live show in London in November 2014 at the Eventim Apollo supported by Gang of Four.

Numan collaborated with the industrial pop group VOWWS for "Losing Myself in You" on their debut album The Great Sun.

On 6 May 2016, Numan was one of several collaborators on Jean-Michel Jarre's album Electronica 2: The Heart of Noise, with the track "Here for You", cowritten by Jarre and Numan.

On 10 May 2016, Numan was named the recipient of the 2016 Moog Innovation Award by Moog Music. On 18 May 2017, Numan received an Ivor Novello Inspiration Award from the British Academy of Songwriters, Composers, and Authors.

In 2017, Numan released the single "My Name Is Ruin" and went on a European tour September. Numan's album Savage (Songs from a Broken World) was released on 15 September and charted at number two in the UK. He was the winner of the 2017 T3 tech legends award.

On 24 September 2018, Numan's tour bus hit and killed an elderly man in Cleveland, Ohio, US. The driver was not immediately charged. Numan was scheduled to appear at the Cleveland House of Blues that evening but cancelled the show for being "inappropriate" in light of the day's tragedy.

His next album Intruder was released on 21 May 2021. The title track was released earlier, on 11 January 2021. Numan discussed its genesis with author Guy Mankowski, who has a chapter on Numan's legacy in his book Albion's Secret History: Snapshots of England's Pop Rebels and Outsiders, as part of an interview series on influential English artists for Zer0 Books.

Following his US Intruder tour in late 2021 and early 2022, Numan began a 17-venue UK tour between late April and late May 2022.

In January 2023, a US show was announced: he will play at the Cruel World Festival in Pasadena, California on May 20, 2023.

Aviation career
Numan joined the Air Training Corps as a teenager, when he wanted to be either a pilot or a pop star. In 1978, he started learning to fly at Blackbushe Airport, but the success of his music career in 1979 meant that obtaining his pilot's licence was delayed until 17 December 1980. The following day; 18 December 1980, Numan bought his first aeroplane for £12,000; a Cessna 182. On 1 July 1981, Numan founded Numanair, a small charter flight company operating from Blackbushe, and acquired a Cessna 210 Centurion (registered G-OILS) and a Piper Navajo (registered G-NMAN). He also indulged his passion for motor racing in 1981 by sponsoring Mike Mackonochie who drove a Van Diemen RF81 in Numanair livery in the Formula Ford 1600 class.

In November and December 1981, Numan successfully flew around the world in his Piper Navajo with co-pilot Bob Thompson on their second attempt. The first attempt, in the Cessna 210 Centurion, had ended in India with Numan and Thompson being arrested on suspicion of smuggling and spying. This aircraft was written off on 29 January 1982 when it ran out of fuel near Southampton and made a forced landing while Numan was flying on it as a passenger.

In 1984, Numan bought a Harvard T-6 trainer aircraft registered G-AZSC and had the aircraft painted to resemble a Japanese Zero fighter. He also gained a display pilot's licence and flew the machine on the UK air display circuit. He and friend Norman Lees, who also owned a Harvard, formed the Radial Pair, performing synchronised aerobatics from the 1992 air display season. Later they teamed up with other Harvard owners to fly up to five aircraft as the Harvard Formation Team with Numan choreographing their aerobatic routines.

Numan held licences for piston and turbine helicopters and had a fixed wing multi engined rating. He was an aerobatic flying instructor and was appointed by the Civil Aviation Authority as an air display pilot evaluator. Then in 2005, after several of his friends and colleagues were killed in unrelated flying accidents, he gave up flying. In an interview in 2009 he said "I loved going to air shows, you'd bond really tightly with your team mates – it's an extreme thing to be doing, and you trust your life to them. And then it ended. I'd turn up and not know anyone. It got depressing. I'd sit down in the pilot's tent and there'd be all these people I'd not recognise. You'd look forward to someone turning up to have a chat with them, and they'd be dead."

Numanair continued operating but after 31 years, with Numan and his family emigrating to the US, it was dissolved on 18 June 2013.

Artistry and image
In the late 1970s, Numan began developing his style. According to Numan, this was an unintentional result of acne; before an appearance on Top of the Pops, "I had spots everywhere, so they slapped about half an inch of white make-up on me before I'd even walked in the door. And my eyes were like pissholes in the snow, so they put black on there. My so-called image fell into place an hour before going on the show." His "wooden" stage presence was, in his words, a result of "incredible self-consciousness" and "incompetence – I didn't know to move on stage". He became enamoured by the idea of "being cold about everything, not letting emotions get to you, or presenting a front of not feeling".

A prolific songwriter, Numan has written about 400 songs. His starting point is usually a piano to work out melodies and chord structures. Most of the songs on his early albums were written on a piano his parents had bought him: later in his career he has used a piano preset on the computer as a starting point. However, his biggest hit "Cars" was unconventionally written on a bass guitar.

Numan's recognizable vocals have become one of his trademarks, along with his androgynous "android" stage persona.

Legacy

Within the UK's burgeoning synth-pop scene, Numan was the first artist to achieve mainstream notoriety. His music and live performances met with censure from critics; he also faced condemnation from the Musicians' Union, who claimed he was putting "proper" musicians out of work. Andy McCluskey of Orchestral Manoeuvres in the Dark (OMD) observed "nasty, nasty, vitriolic journalism" directed at Numan, who was dismissed as "pretentious" and "pseudo-intellectual". He nevertheless generated an army of fans calling themselves "Numanoids", providing him with a fanbase which maintained their support through the latter half of the 1980s, when his fortunes began to fall. He maintains a cult following, and has sold over 10 million records.

Numan is considered a pioneer of electronic music; Nightshift identified Numan, and fellow late 1970s debutants OMD and the Human League, as "the holy trinity of synth-pop". He has been credited as a key influence by fellow British musician Kim Wilde as she was working on her debut single "Kids in America" with her brother Ricky. Curt Smith and Roland Orzabal of Tears for Fears, another new wave act of the 1980s, cited Numan's style as one that inspired them while recording their debut album The Hurting. Since the 1990s Numan has been cited as a major influence by a variety of bands and artists from hip hop to industrial rock, including Africa Bambaataa, Fear Factory, Nine Inch Nails, and Marilyn Manson.

Fear Factory produced a cover of "Cars" (featuring a prominent guest appearance by Numan himself) for the digipak version of their 1999 album, Obsolete. Numan had become acknowledged and respected by his peers, with such musicians as Dave Grohl (of Foo Fighters, with whom he covered Down in the Park on 1996's Songs in the Key of X, and Nirvana), Trent Reznor (of Nine Inch Nails, whose 2018 leg of the Cold and Black and Infinite tour concluded with a guest performance by Numan, who Reznor described as "vitally important and a huge inspiration"), and Marilyn Manson (who released his own cover of "Down In the Park" as the B-side of his band's 1995 album Lunchbox) proclaiming his work an influence. The band Basement Jaxx had a huge hit in 2002 with "Where's Your Head At", which relied on a sample of Numan's "M.E."—from The Pleasure Principle—for its hook. Nine Inch Nails covered the song "Metal" on The Fragile remix album Things Falling Apart, as did Afrika Bambaataa (with Numan himself) on the album Dark Matter Moving at the Speed of Light. "Cars" remains Numan's most enduring song; it was a hit again in 1987 (remixed by Zeus B. Held) and 1996, in the latter case thanks to an appearance in an advert for Carling Brewery. In 2000, DJ Armand Van Helden sampled the track in his single "Koochy". In 2002, English girl group the Sugababes scored a No. 1 with "Freak Like Me," a mashup of Adina Howard's "Freak Like Me" and "Are "Friends" Electric?" by Numan's Tubeway Army.

Personal life
Numan is an atheist. He was an outspoken supporter of the Conservative Party and Margaret Thatcher after her election as Prime Minister. He later expressed regret for giving his public support, calling it "a noose around my neck". He has previously said that he considers himself neither left- nor right-wing and that he did not support Tony Blair or David Cameron. He also said, "I'm not socialist, I know that. I don't believe in sharing my money." Numan is not overly politically engaged and distances himself from political commentary.

In 1997, Numan married Gemma O'Neill, a member of his fan club from Sidcup. They have three daughters. Persia, at the age of 11, contributed vocals to Numan's 2017 song "My Name Is Ruin" and appeared in its video. Numan and his family lived in Essex, then Heathfield and Waldron in East Sussex, and in October 2012 moved to Santa Monica, California.

At age 15, after a series of outbursts in which he would "smash things up, scream and shout, get in people's faces and break stuff", Numan was prescribed antidepressants and anxiolytics. In the 1990s, his wife suggested he had Asperger syndrome; after reading about the syndrome and taking a series of online tests, he agreed, though he has never been officially diagnosed. Conversely, he said in an April 2018 interview with The Guardian that he had been diagnosed with Asperger syndrome at the age of 14. In a 2001 interview, he said, "Polite conversation has never been one of my strong points. Just recently I actually found out that I'd got a mild form of Asperger's syndrome which basically means I have trouble interacting with people. For years, I couldn't understand why people thought I was arrogant, but now it all makes more sense."

Numan published his autobiography, Praying to the Aliens, in 1997 (updated in 1998), in collaboration with Steve Malins, who also wrote the liner notes for most of the CD reissues of Numan's albums in the late 1990s, as well as executive producing the Hybrid album in 2003.

An updated autobiography, (R)evolution: The Autobiography, was published on 22 October 2020 and brings his career up to date from the earlier Praying to the Aliens.

Discography

Tubeway Army
Tubeway Army (1978)
Replicas (1979)

 Solo
The Pleasure Principle (1979)
Telekon (1980)
Dance (1981)
I, Assassin (1982)
Warriors (1983)
Berserker (1984)
The Fury (1985)
Strange Charm (1986)
Metal Rhythm (1988) (New Anger in the U.S.)
Automatic (1989) (with Bill Sharpe as Sharpe & Numan)

Outland (1991)
Machine + Soul (1992)
Sacrifice (1994) (Dawn in the U.S.)
Human (1995) (with Michael R. Smith)
Exile (1997)
Pure (2000)
Jagged (2006)
Dead Son Rising (2011)
Splinter (Songs from a Broken Mind) (2013)
Savage (Songs from a Broken World) (2017)
Intruder (2021)

See also
List of 1970s one-hit wonders in the United States

References

Bibliography
Paul Goodwin (2004). Electric Pioneer: An Armchair Guide to Gary Numan, Helter Skelter Publishing, 2004, 
Guinness Book of British Hit Singles, 7th Edition,

External links

Numanme Gary Numan Fan Site

1958 births
Living people
Atco Records artists
Beggars Banquet Records artists
British synth-pop new wave musicians
Critics of Christianity
English atheists
Eagle Records artists
English expatriates in the United States
English industrial musicians
English male singer-songwriters
English new wave musicians
English record producers
English rock guitarists
English rock singers
Gothic rock musicians
I.R.S. Records artists
English male guitarists
Male new wave singers
Metropolis Records artists
Musicians from London
People educated at Ashford County Grammar School
People educated at Upton Court Grammar School
People from Hammersmith
Second British Invasion artists
Tubeway Army members
20th-century English singers
20th-century British guitarists
21st-century English singers
21st-century British guitarists
20th-century British male singers
21st-century British male singers